The Symbol of the Unconquered (also known as The Wilderness Trail) is a 1920 silent "race film" drama produced, written and directed by Oscar Micheaux. It is Micheaux's fourth feature-length film and along with Within Our Gates is among his early surviving works. The Symbol of the Unconquered was made at Fort Lee, New Jersey, and released by Micheaux on November 29, 1920. A print of the film is extant at the Museum of Modern Art in New York. The film is based on the way perceptions of race shape human relationships.

Plot
Eve Mason is a "white-skinned" African American who inherits a large amount of land after the death of her grandfather Dick Mason, an old prospector. She leaves her hometown of Selma, Alabama for the Northwest to settle in a place called Oristown. Upon arrival she decides to stay in the Driscoll Hotel but its owner, Jefferson Driscoll, a self-hating light-skinned black man, is passing as white and scorns the company of other African Americans. Driscoll forces Eve to sleep outside in his barn, where she is menaced by another black man Driscoll has sent to sleep there. Exhausted from her journey but too terrified to stay in the barn, Eve runs out into the woods, and Driscoll laughs uproariously at her distress. In the morning, she meets a kind, young prospector named Hugh Van Allen, who happens to be her new neighbor. Van Allen is also African American, but doesn't realize that Eve is too. They become fast friends, and Van Allen offers Eve a ride to her new house. When they get there, Van Allen continues to show kindness and helps Eve get settled into her little cabin. Before leaving, he gives Eve a gun and tells her to shoot it twice if she's ever in trouble. That way he will know to come right over.

On the other side of town, August Barr and Tugi, a couple of criminals, are meeting with Barr's brother-in-law Peter Kaden. They tell Kaden that they need a couple of important documents, most of which he can find at Dick Mason's house and force him to go and retrieve the documents himself. He goes there later that night and peeks his head in the window, startling Eve so much that her scream is heard by Van Allen. Kaden is able to run away before being discovered by Van Allen, who calms Eve down and even offers to keep watch outside for the rest of the night.

The next day Driscoll, who has quit the hotel business, sells two stolen horses to Van Allen. Before long Van Allen is approached by the horses’ real owner and learns of Driscoll's true nature. He confronts Driscoll at the local saloon where the two men have a physical altercation, which ends with Van Allen as the winner and Driscoll proclaiming that he will have his revenge. Later Driscoll's mother, whose dark features Driscoll despises, comes to town and runs into Eve, who befriends the woman despite still having ill feelings towards her son.

At the post office Driscoll picks up a letter meant for Van Allen that was accidentally dropped by the mail man. After reading it he learns that Van Allen's land has incredible value and shows the information to Barr and Tugi. They enlist the help of Bill Stanton, a Ku Klux Klan member, and continually leave threatening notes outside of Van Allen's tent in order to get him to sell. This doesn't work however and Bill Stanton decides to ride onto the land one night with other Klan members. Their attack fails thanks to some help from other members of the community, specifically a colored man with a brick, and afterwards Van Allen finally learns that the reason his land is so sought after is because of the abundance of oil fields.

Two years go by and Van Allen has become one of the oil kings, running his own company. Eve drops by to deliver a letter from The Committee for the Defense of the Colored Race that reveals Eve's black parentage. The film ends with Van Allen learning the truth and the two of them declaring their love for each other.

Cast

 Iris Hall as Eve Mason
 Walker Thompson as Hugh Van Allen
 Lawrence Chenault as Jefferson Driscoll
 Mattie Wilkes as Mother Driscoll
 Louis Dean as August Barr
 Leigh Whipper as Tugi, Indian Fakir
 Jim Burris as ?
 E. G. Tatum as Abraham
 James Burrrough as ?
 George Catlin as Dick Mason
 Edward Fraction as Peter Kaden

References

Further reading
 Gotto, Lisa. "The Symbol of the Unconquered." Passing and Posing between Black and White. Calibrating the Color Line in U.S. Cinema. Bielefeld: transcript (2021): 47–75. Print.
 Regester, Charlene. "The Misreading and Rereading of African American Filmmaker Oscar Micheaux." Film History 7.4 (1995): 426–49. Web.
 Flory, Dan. "Race, Rationality, and Melodrama: Aesthetic Response and the Case of Oscar Micheaux." Journal of Aesthetics and Art Criticism 63.4 (2005): 327–38. Web.
 Miller, James A. "The Case of Early Black Cinema." Critical Studies in Mass Communication 10.2 (1993): n. p. Web.
Smith, J. Douglas. "Patrolling the Boundaries of Race: Motion Picture Censorship and Jim Crow in Virginia, 1922–1932." Historical Journal of Film, Radio and Television 21.3 (2001): 273–91. Web.
 Moos, Dan. "Reclaiming the Frontier: Oscar Micheaux as Black Turnerian." African American Review 36.3 (2002): 357. Web.
Mcgilligan, Patrick. "Me and Oscar Micheaux: An Interview with LeRoy Collins." Film Quarterly 57.4 (2004): 2–7. Web.
 Stoddard, Jeremy D., and Alan S. Marcus. "The Burden Of Historical Representation: Race, Freedom, And 'Educational' Hollywood Film." Film & History: An Interdisciplinary Journal of Film and Television Studies 36.1 (1): 26–35. Print
 Bernstein, Matthew. "Oscar Micheaux and Leo Frank: Cinematic Justice Across the Color Line." Film Quarterly 57.4 (2004): 8–21. Print.
 Bronski, Michael. "The Return of the Repressed: Leo Frank Through the Eyes of Oscar Micheaux." Shofar: An Interdisciplinary Journal of Jewish Studies 23.4 (2005): 26–49. Print.
 Lennig, Arthur. "Myth and Fact: The Reception of The Birth of a Nation." Film History: An International Journal 16.2 (2004): 117–41. Print.

External links

 
 
 
 

1920 films
American silent feature films
Films directed by Oscar Micheaux
Race films
Films shot in Fort Lee, New Jersey
Articles containing video clips
American black-and-white films
1920s American films